Football Club Istiklol
(),, is a Tajik professional football club based in Dushanbe. Founded in 2007, the club competes in the Ligai Olii Tojikiston, the top flight of Tajik football league system. It was founded to commemorate the Independence of Tajikistan; Istiklol in Tajik means 'independence'.

History

Early years (2007–2009)
Istiklol Dushanbe was established in November 2007, under the Presidency of Shohruh Saidov. In 2008, Istiklol competed in the Dushanbe Group of the Second Division under the guidance of head coach Kanoat Latifov, winning all 30 league games with a +154 goal difference and winning promotion to the Tajik League.

In 2009, in their debut in the Tajik League, led by new head coach Salohiddin Gafurov, the team finished fourth. The team had some experienced players and some young players mostly from Tajikistan national under-17 football team that won bronze in AFC U-17 Championship 2006 and reached round 16 at 2007 FIFA U-17 World Championship, winning two trophies – the traditional winter-spring tournament Rustam Doltabaev and the Tajik Cup. Dilshod Vasiev scored the club's first Tajik League goal in their 2–0 victory over Ravshan Kulob on 4 April 2009.

2010s
In 2010, under coach Alimzhon Rafikov the team won the Super Cup, the national cup and league. In the first Tajik Super Cup, defeating three-time national champion Vakhsh Qurghonteppa 2–0, following two goals from Dilshod Vasiev in extra time. In the final of the 2010 Tajik Cup, which traditionally takes place on October 5 – the birthday of the country's President Emomali Rahmon, Istiqlol with large score 5–0 defeated FK Khujand. Following victory in the 2010 Tajik League, FC Istiqlol qualified for the first time for both the CIS Cup and the 2011 AFC President's Cup. On 20 March 2012, Istiklol's contract with Rafikov had expired at the end of the 2011 season and they had decided not to renew it, with Mubin Ergashev taking over in a caretaker capacity.

As of January 2014 the club's manager has been Mubin Ergashev.

On 22 November 2015, Manuel Bleda scored the club's 500th league goal. Istiklol's 4–2 victory over Barki Tajik on 17 April 2016, saw the club stretch their unbeaten run in the Tajik League to 40 games, with their last defeat occurring in November 2013 against Khayr Vahdat. During this run Istiklol have scored 146 goals, conceding just 17. Also, the team was qualified for the 2015 AFC Cup final against Johor Darul Ta'zim F.C. of Malaysia, in which both teams were the finalist for the first time in the competition. Istiklol were defeated by the team with the score of 1–0 on the home soil in Dushanbe.

On 10 July 2016, Istiklol fired their entire coaching staff, including manager Mubin Ergashev. Three days later, 13 July 2016, Istiklol announced Nikola Lazarevic as their new manager.

On 25 September 2016, Istiklol suffered their first League defeat since 3 November 2013, a stretch of 51 games, 2–1 away to Ravshan Kulob. On 29 October 2016, Istiklol defeated Barki Tajik 5–1, to claim their fifth Tajik League title. Two days later, 31 October 2016, Istiklol announced that they had appointed Mukhsin Mukhamadiev for the 2017 season. On 18 September 2017, Istiklol defeated Panjshir 5–0 to secure their sixth Tajik League title. On 18 October 2017, Istiklol drew 2–2 with Bengaluru in the second leg of their Inter-zone play-off final, progressing to the final of the AFC Cup for the second time in three seasons. On 4 November 2017, Istiklol were defeated 1–0 by Al-Quwa Al-Jawiya thanks to a second half Emad Mohsin goal.
After being knocked out of the 2018 AFC Cup at the group stage, manager Mukhsin Mukhamadiev resigned as manager six-days later on 22 May 2018, with Alisher Tukhtaev being appointed as acting head coach.

On 3 December 2018, Khakim Fuzailov was announced as Istiklol's new manager. Fuzailov resigned as manager of Istiklol on 27 June 2019 after they failed to progress from the group stages of the AFC Cup, with Alisher Tukhtaev being appointed as Caretaker Manager in his place. On 27 September 2019, Istiklol beat Kuktosh 6–1, to secure their eighth Tajik League title. On 24 November 2019, Istiklol won 4–2 penalties to clinch their eighth Tajik Cup title.

2020s
On 21 January 2020, Istiklol defeated Lokomotiv Tashkent 1–0, to win their first ever AFC Champions League match.
After Mubin Ergashev took charge of Istiklol for their two AFC Champions League matches, Vitaliy Levchenko was appointed as the club's new manager on 17 February 2020, with Alisher Tukhtaev returning to an assistants role.

On 10 September 2020, the 2020 AFC Cup was cancelled. 10 days later, 20 September 2020, Istiklol drew 1–1 with Khatlon to secure their ninth league title and seventh in a row.

On 13 April, Istiklol announced former manager Mubin Ergashev as their interim manager for their AFC Champions League group games due to having the required Pro Coaching License Vitaliy Levchenko did not. Istiklol finished their first AFC Champions League group stage top of their group, which included Al Hilal, Shabab Al Ahli and AGMK, qualifying for the knockout stage where they faced Persepolis.

On 21 June 2021, Ryota Noma scored the club's 800th league goal. On 21 November 2021, Istiklol defeated Dushanbe-83 8–0 to secure their 10th league title, and 8th in a row.
On 27 June 2022, Vitaly Levchenko and his coaching staff left Istiklol after their contracts expired, with Assistant Manager Alisher Tukhtaev being placed in interim charger.

On 29 October 2022, Alisher Tukhtaev guided Istiklol to their ninth Tajik Cup title with a 5–3 victory on penalties over Kuktosh Rudaki after the match finished 2-2. Six days later, 4 November 2022, Istiklol beat Khatlon 1-0 to secure their 11th Tajikistan Higher League title, and 9th in a row.

On 18 January 2023, Igor Cherevchenko was appointed as the new Head Coach of Istiklol on a one-year contract.

Sponsorship

Domestic history

Continental history

Honours

Team
 Tajik League (11) (record)  2010, 2011, 2014, 2015, 2016, 2017, 2018, 2019, 2020, 2021, 2022
 Tajik Cup (9) (record) 2009, 2010, 2013, 2014, 2015, 2016, 2018, 2019, 2022
 Tajik Supercup (11) (record) 2010, 2011, 2012, 2014, 2015, 2016, 2018, 2019, 2020, 2021, 2022
TFF Cup (6) 2014, 2015, 2017, 2018, 2019, 2021
 AFC President's Cup Winners (1) 2012
 AFC Cup  Runners-up (2): 2015, 2017

Individual
 Tajikistan's Most Valuable Player of year 2010: Yusuf Rabiev
 Tajikistan Best defender award for year 2010: Eraj Rajabov
 Tajikistan's Coach of year 2010: Alimzhon Rafikov

Current squad
Notable players
Had international caps for their respective countries. Players whose name is listed in bold represented their countries while playing for Istiklol.
Foreign players who've played for Istiklol.

Tajikistan

Former USSR countries

South America

Europe

Asia

Africa

Club officials
Management team
Head coach: Igor Cherevchenko
Assistant coach: Yuri Baturenko
Coach: VacantGoalkeeping coach: VacantYouth Team Manager: Rustam Kurbanov
Youth Team assistant Manager: Daler Kayosov
Administrator: Odil Irgashev
Doctor: Farrukh Avezov
Physiotherapist: Erkin Dodojonov

Notable managersInformation correct as of match played 9 November 2022. Only competitive matches are counted.''

Notes:

See also
 Esteghlal
 Esteghlal Ahvaz
 Esteghlal Khuzestan

References

External links
  ; archived

 
Football clubs in Dushanbe
Football clubs in Tajikistan
2007 establishments in Tajikistan
Association football clubs established in 2007
I